On Call: Siksik Sa Impormasyon. Bilis na Pag-Aksyon. is a Philippine television public service show broadcast by GMA News TV. Anchored by Ivan Mayrina and Connie Sison, it premiered on February 28, 2011. The show concluded on May 30, 2012.

Background
The program was described as a news and public service program, which it is aired on GMA News TV. It on the spot assistance to viewers with questions and concerns by putting them in touch with relevant government agencies and authorities. The show will address women's and children's issues, reveal corruption caught on cam, provide free legal advice, announce job vacancies, deliver the latest public health updates and others.

This was the second program for the tandem of Ivan and Connie; the first being News on Q which ended on February 18, 2011 since Q was discontinued.

On May 23, 2011, On Call moved timeslot from 4:00pm to 1:00pm and replaced their original tagline, Balita. Serbisyo. Ngayon. (News. Service. Today.) with Serbisyong Totoo. Ngayon. (True Service. Today.), which is based on the tagline of GMA News and Public Affairs.

In the first quarter of 2012, On Call was reduced into 30 minutes from 1 hour and replaced again the tagline as Siksik sa Impormasyon. Bilis na Pag-Aksyon. (Pack with Information. Fast Action.)

On May 30, 2012, after 5 months of the impeachment and also, the verdict of Chief Justice Renato Corona, On Call bids goodbye to its viewers due to unknown reason. Thus, it replaced with Cinema Klasika (a reincarnation of Ginintuan Telon and Pinoy Cine Klasika of its predecessor, Q) at the timeslot of On Call in the next day.

Hosts
 Ivan Mayrina
 Connie Sison

Accolades

References

2011 Philippine television series debuts
2012 Philippine television series endings
Filipino-language television shows
GMA News TV original programming
GMA Integrated News and Public Affairs shows